Tengku Zafrul bin Tengku Abdul Aziz (born 25 June 1973) is a Malaysian Politician and Investor who has served as Minister of International Trade and Industry in the Pakatan Harapan (PH) Administration under Prime Minister Anwar Ibrahim since December 2022 and Senator from March 2020 to his resignation in November 2022 and again since December 2022. He served as Minister of Finance for the second term in the Barisan Nasional (BN) administration under former Prime Minister Ismail Sabri Yaakob from August 2021 to November 2022 and his first term from March 2020 to August 2021 as well as Coordinating Minister of the National Recovery Plan from July 2021 to August 2021 in the Perikatan Nasional (PN) Administration under former Prime Minister Muhyiddin Yassin. As he was not an elected Member of Parliament, he was appointed as an Independent Senator twice in March 2020 and again in December 2022, in order to assume his duties as the First Technocratic Minister of Finance in March 2020 as he was also the First Independent individual in terms of active political party association, to be appointed Minister of Finance in the Malaysian history. Prior to his political appointments, he was the Chief Executive Officer (CEO) and Executive Director of the CIMB Group Holdings Berhad. He was also CEO and Executive Director of the CIMB Bank Berhad and President Commissioner of the PT Bank CIMB Niaga Tbk. He is a member of the United Malays National Organisation (UMNO), a component party of the ruling Barisan Nasional (BN) coalition. He has also served as the State Treasurer of BN of Selangor since July 2022, this appointment also marks the start of his involvement in active Politics.

Early life and education 
Tengku Zafrul was born on 25 June 1973 and is the eldest of four siblings. His mother, Raja Datuk Zaharaton Raja Zainal Abidin, is the former Director-General of the Economic Planning Unit (EPU) of the Prime Minister's Department of Malaysia and his father, Tengku Abdul Aziz Tengku Harris, is a Businessman.

Tengku Zafrul began his early education at Sri Petaling Primary School and Bukit Bintang Primary School. He continued his study at Malay College Kuala Kangsar and then studied A-Level at Sherborne School, Dorset, United Kingdom. He graduated from the University of Bristol, UK with a Bachelor of Science (Hons) in Economics and Accounting, and obtained a Master of Arts (MA) in Finance and Management from the University of Exeter, UK. From the year 2017 to 2019, Tengku Zafrul completed his second Master's Degree in Business Administration (MBA) at Tsinghua University PBCSF (People's Bank of China School of Finance). He is also a Fellow Chartered Banker with the Asian Institute of Chartered Bankers.

Corporate career 
Zafrul started out as a Corporate Finance Executive in AmInvestment Bank in 1996. He then joined Crédit Agricole as an Investment Analyst, moving up to Director within a few years. Succeeding this, he became the Advisor to the President of Tenaga Nasional Berhad. Zafrul then joined CIMB Investment Banking, after which he was appointed as Group Managing Director of Avenue Capital Resources (now ECM Libra), a listed company specialising in Financial Services i.e. Investment Banking and Fund Management. He was also chief executive officer of Avenue Securities and the chairman of Avenue Asset Management. Zafrul then went on to become the head of investment banking for Citigroup Malaysia.

He is also the main Investor behind Tune Money Sdn Bhd, Asia's first "no-frills" online financial service provider as well as its CEO and substantial shareholder. Following that, Zafrul was appointed as Group Director of Kenanga Holdings Berhad and Director of Kenanga Investment Bank Berhad. Prior to assuming his most recent role with CIMB, Zafrul was the Chief Executive Officer of Maybank Investment Bank, the fully-owned investment banking arm of Malayan Banking Berhad, Malaysia's flagship financial services player. The acquisition of Kim Eng Holdings Limited (Kim Eng) by the Maybank Group in 2011 resulted in the combined entity of Maybank IB and Kim Eng, known regionally as Maybank Kim Eng, of which Zafrul was also CEO. On 9 March 2020, Tengku Zafrul announced his resignation as CIMB Group Chief Executive Officer before being appointed Minister of Finance.

Other positions 
AmInvestment Bank (Corporate Finance Executives) (June 1996 - April 1997)
Credit Agricole (Investment Analyst and Director) (May 1997 - August 1998) & (July 1999 - March 2001)
Tenaga Nasional Bhd (President's advisor) (March 2001 - September 2002)
CIMB Investment Bank Berhad (Director, "Client Coverage") (September 2002 - April 2003)
Avenue Capital Resources Bhd/Avenue Securities (now ECM Libra) (Chief Executive Officer and Chairman) (2003 - 2006)
Citigroup Malaysia (Head of Investment Banking) (April 2006 - March 2007)
Tune Money (Chief Executive Officer) (March 2007 - December 2008)
Kenanga Holdings Berhad and Investment (Group Director) (January 2009 - June 2010)
Maybank Investment Bank Berhad and Maybank Kim Eng Holdings (Chief Executive Officer) (June 2010 - December 2013)
CIMB Investment Bank Berhad (Chief Executive Officer & Co-Chairman of Corporate Solutions) (2014 - 2016)
CIMB Bank Berhad (Chief Executive Officer) (2014 - 2015)
CIMB Group Holdings Berhad (Group Chief Executive Officer) (February 2015 - 9 March 2020)

Recognition and awards 
Throughout his career, Zafrul was awarded with numerous Prestigious Awards including ASEAN CEO Award by Technology Business Review (2008). He also was given the Malaysian Business Leadership Award in the year 2009. Most Promising Entrepreneurship Awards by Enterprise Asia (2008) and the Malaysian Business Leadership Award by The Leaders Magazine. Most recently, he was awarded the Masterclass CEO of the Year in the 7th Global Leadership Award organised by the American Leadership Development Association (2017) and the Best Chief Executive Officer for Investor Relations by the Malaysia Investor Relations Association (2017). Tengku Zafrul has also bagsed TalentCorp's Life at Work 2019 Award for the CEO category of Malaysian organizations.

Television and other media 
Tengku Zafrul was one of the Judges of the corporate reality television series The Firm. The show premièred prime time nationwide on NTV7 and Astro's Channel 7 in Malaysia in 2007. As one of the three millionaire judges on The Firm, the other two beings Peter Pek and Chan Boon Yong, he is considered one of Malaysia's few corporate celebrities. He has also appeared in advertisements for Tune Money. On 4 July 2020, Tengku Zafrul became a Special Guest on TV3's Money Matters program.

Government positions

Minister of Finance 
On 9 March 2020, Tengku Zafrul was appointed in Muhyiddin's cabinet as Minister of Finance after being made a Senator. He embarked on a task to assist the people and industry in the implementation of the Prihatin Rakyat Economic Stimulus Package during the outbreak of the COVID-19 pandemic in Malaysia. Tengku Zafrul also explains the economic recovery plan will be announced after Aidilfitri to revive the affected economy of Malaysia. Under the Short-Term Economic Recovery Plan (PENJANA), Tengku Zafrul has launched the ePenjana credit program worth RM750 million to aimed at boosting consumer spending in Malaysia. On 6 November 2020, Tengku Zafrul presented the 2021 budget in the Parliament to ensure that the economy revives and benefits the people.

In June 2022, Tengku Zafrul announced the largest subsidies and cash aid package in Malaysian history (77.3 billion ringgit) for the year 2022, in order to temper the effect of inflation.

Minister of International Trade and Industry
Tengku Datuk Seri Zafrul Tengku Abdul Aziz has been appointed as the International Trade and Industry Minister in the unity government led by Prime Minister Datuk Seri Anwar Ibrahim.

Personal life 
Tengku Zafrul is married to Raja Datin Seri Utama Johanna Raja Arshad, a Member of Selangor and Negeri Sembilan Royal Family. The couple has four children.

Since his school days, Tengku Zafrul was interested in sports such as hockey and ran for recreation. During his first year at the University of Bristol, his main transportation was by Bicycle. His interests include keeping fit through running, cycling and swimming, and developing the youth through his participation in various organizations such as the Kalsom Movement and Teach for Malaysia. He has completed all Six Marathons under the Abbott World Marathon Majors. He is also a fan of the football club, Liverpool F.C., which plays in the English Premier League.

Honours

Honours of Malaysia
  :
 Grand Knight of the Order of the Territorial Crown (SUMW) – Datuk Seri Utama (2021)
  :
  Knight Companion of the Order of Sultan Ahmad Shah of Pahang (DSAP) – Dato' (2009)
  Grand Knight of the Order of Sultan Ahmad Shah of Pahang (SSAP) – Dato' Sri (2015)
  :
  Knight Commander of the Order of Loyalty to Negeri Sembilan (DPNS) – Dato' (2014)
  :
  Knight Commander of the Order of the Crown of Selangor (DPMS) – Dato' (2016)
  Knight Grand Commander of the Order of the Crown of Selangor (SPMS) – Dato' Seri (2022)
  :
  Knight Grand Commander of the Order of the Life of the Crown of Kelantan (SJMK) – Dato' (2022)

Election results

References

1973 births
Living people
People from Kuala Lumpur
Malaysian people of Malay descent
Malaysian Muslims
Malaysian businesspeople
Malaysian bankers
Malaysian chief executives
Malaysian bloggers
Malaysian television personalities
Government ministers of Malaysia
Finance ministers of Malaysia
Members of the Dewan Negara
21st-century Malaysian politicians
Knights Commander of the Order of the Crown of Selangor
Knights Grand Commander of the Order of the Crown of Selangor